"The Demon's Head" is the fourth episode of the fourth season and 70th episode overall from the Fox series Gotham. The show is itself based on the characters created by DC Comics set in the Batman mythology. The episode was written by main cast member Ben McKenzie on his writing debut and directed by Kenneth Fink. It was first broadcast on October 12, 2017.

In the episode, Bruce and Alfred set to discover more about the knife and its big importance to Ra's al Ghul. They leave the knife to museum curator Dr. Niles Winthrop and his grandson, Alex, to research more about the knife. However, Ra's continues his search for the knife, killing Niles in the process. Alex manages to escape and Bruce needs to find him to know everything he wants from the knife. Meanwhile, Cobblepot and Sofia set to make business together but this brings big consequences for Sofia. Nygma also continues wanting to regain his previous persona after struggling through his Riddler persona.

The episode received positive reviews from critics, who highlighted the writing, Alexander Siddig's performance and the development of Bruce Wayne's storyline.

Plot
Bruce (David Mazouz) and Alfred (Sean Pertwee) take the knife for inspection to antiquist Niles Winthrop (Dakin Matthews). He is soon joined by his grandson, Alex (Benjamin Stockham), who takes an interest in the knife as well and set to give him the information the next day. Meanwhile, Nygma (Cory Michael Smith) is setting on to have new riddles and also sets to get his revenge on Cobblepot (Robin Lord Taylor).

That night, Niles discovers a message from the symbols with something related to "The Demon's Head". According to a legend, a man had the ability to resurrect and went by the name of "Ra's al Ghul". Then, Ra's (Alexander Siddig) arrives looking for the knife. Niles has Alex hidden and when he refuses to give the location, gets his neck snapped by Ra's. Gordon (Ben McKenzie) is called to investigate the scene when Bruce comes in and finds Niles' body. After giving away Alex's involvement, Bruce mentions to Gordon that Barbara (Erin Richards) also wanted the knife. Ra's meets with Barbara and introduces her to "Anubis", a man manipulated to act like a dog to track the knife.

Cobblepot has a meeting with Sofia (Crystal Reed) in his office in order to discuss business. He then receives a message from a man sent by Nygma, asking to meet in the pier. Gordon goes to interrogate Barbara but their meeting is interrupted by Bruce, who accuses Barbara of working with Ra's but she denies his involvement. They then find Alex in a library but they are attacked by the Anubis and an assassin (Owen Harn), looking for the knife. They manage to beat them and escape to the precinct but Bruce and Alex flee. There, Gordon is met by Ra's, who claims to be a Nanda Parbat officer. While questioning, Alfred interrupts and attacks Ra's after recognizing him and then he disappears.

Sofia meets with many of Falcone's loyal mobsters but they are intercepted by Cobblepot and Zsasz (Anthony Carrigan). While Zsasz executes them, Cobblepot tells Sofia he used her in order to get him close to the mob connections to avoid competition. He then receives another message from Nygma for another meeting as he failed to find him. Bruce and Alex flee to the National Museum but they are attacked by the assassin and Anubis. Gordon arrives and kills both of them. Ra's shows up and holds Alex hostage, demanding the knife. Bruce refuses to give him the knife, as it's extremely important. An impressed Ra's kills Alex and lets himself get arrested.

Nygma shows up in Cobblepot's club, demanding to meet him. Cobblepot appears and explains that he didn't show up because his riddles are nonsense and illogical despite Nygma claiming the riddle was right. Cobblepot manages to make him see that his high intelligence is gone and he's no longer Edward Nygma. He's about to have Victor Fries (Nathan Darrow) to freeze Nygma again but changes his mind, deciding that he will live, but not known as The Riddler and humiliated at never been the same. Sofia meets with Gordon to discuss what happened to Cobblepot. After an argument, they kiss passionately. Meanwhile, Ra's is being escorted to prison, smiling, implying this is part of his plan.

Production

Development
In September 2017, it was announced that the fourth episode of the season would be titled "The Demon's Head" and was to be written by Ben McKenzie on his writing debut and directed by Kenneth Fink.

Writing
Ben McKenzie made his writing debut on the episode, after previously directing the third-season episode, "These Delicate and Dark Obsessions". McKenzie went to Los Angeles to work on the writers' room to break the story and then go back to New York City and finish many drafts. He explained, "I've been fiddling around with writing for a long time, but I'd never written an episode of television, so it was quite a learning process." He also added that, "From being on a set, the directing came fairly naturally. It was challenging, but there were a lot of things that I understood about directing just from observing, just from watching director's work. Writing often takes place behind-the-scenes. Physical production is not privy to how scripts come out... I wasn't so familiar with that process of breaking a story, of starting with a story document, then an outline, and then a draft; it was informative"

Casting
Morena Baccarin, Camren Bicondova, Jessica Lucas, Chris Chalk and Drew Powell don't appear in the episode as their respective characters. Baccarin, Bicondova, Lucas and Chalk receive credit only, while Powell is uncredited In September 2017, it was announced that the guest cast for the episode would include Dakin Matthews as Niles Winthrop, Benjamin Stockham as Alex Winthrop, Nathan Darrow as Mr. Freeze, Anthony Carrigan as Victor Zsasz, and Kelcy Griffin as Detective Harper.

Reception

Viewers
The episode was watched by 2.75 million viewers with a 0.9/3 share among adults aged 18 to 49. This was a 6% decrease in viewership from the previous episode, which was watched by 2.92 million viewers with a 0.9/3 in the 18-49 demographics. With these ratings, Gotham ranked second for Fox, behind The Orville, fourth on its timeslot, and eleventh for the night, behind The Orville, How to Get Away with Murder, Great News, Superstore, Chicago Fire, The Good Place, Scandal, Will & Grace, Grey's Anatomy, and Thursday Night Football.

Critical reviews

"A Dark Knight: The Demon's Head" received positive reviews from critics. Matt Fowler of IGN gave the episode a "good" 7.5 out of 10 and wrote in his verdict, "'The Demon's Head' had a few clunky scenes and a couple of humdrum mini-bosses, but Bruce's hard choice at the end, which led to the shocking death of Alex, was an unexpectedly heavy capper that gave this chapter a grave and ghoulish sheen."

Nick Hogan of TV Overmind gave the episode a 4 star rating out of 5, writing "This was easily the best episode of Gotham this season. I'm anxious to see more writing from Ben McKenzie, and I'm excited that Gotham has finally set forth some higher stakes that aren't derived directly from the film series. Of course, I understand that the source material is the same, but I'm always anxious for a new take." Sydney Bucksbaum of The Hollywood Reporter wrote, "Speaking of the literal Demon's Head, the hard-to-spell Ra's al Ghul wasn't trying hard to operate under the radar while on the hunt for his ancient knife, killing the man Bruce hired to study it."

Vinnie Mancuso of Collider wrote, "All in all, 'The Demon's Head' was a middle-of-the-road hour of Gotham, fine but not quite 'James Frain getting blown up by a bazooka' great, silly but not quite Balloonman ridiculous. The feral, fanged dog-man Anubis and his mute brute of an owner made for intimidating enough villains-of-the-week; throwing a bone out a window isn't the most inventive way of dispatching with an antagonist, but given Gothams history I'm just glad it didn't involve a water bowl." Lisa Babick of TV Fanatic gave the series a 4.5 star rating out of 5, writing "I can't believe Ra's al Ghul slit Alex's throat. I mean I can believe it, but it doesn't take away from the shock of it. Ra's al Ghul knew that Bruce wouldn't give up the knife on Gotham Season 4 Episode 4, and killing Alex seemed to be part of the plan to push Bruce further towards his destiny."

References

External links 
 

Gotham (season 4) episodes
2017 American television episodes